This is a list of properties and districts in Oglethorpe County, Georgia that are listed on the National Register of Historic Places (NRHP).

Current listings

|}

References

Oglethorpe
Buildings and structures in Oglethorpe County, Georgia